The 2002 Tour de Hongrie was the 29th edition of the Tour de Hongrie cycle race and was held from 6 to 11 August 2002. The race started in Nagykanizsa and finished in Budapest. The race was won by Zoltán Vanik.

General classification

References

2002
Tour de Hongrie
Tour de Hongrie